Spencer Joseph Levin (born June 15, 1984) is an American professional golfer who currently plays on the Korn Ferry Tour.

Early years and amateur career
Levin was born in Sacramento, California, the son of Carlene (Rossi) and Don Levin. His mother is a cousin of football official Mike Pereira. Levin attended the University of California, Los Angeles before transferring to the University of New Mexico, where he was a two-time All-American. While at New Mexico, Levin played with future PGA Tour professionals Michael Letzig and Wil Collins. In 2004, he finished T-13 at the U.S. Open and was the low amateur; this earned him an invitation for the 2005 tournament, but he missed the cut.

Professional career
Levin turned professional in 2005. He finished 22nd on the 2008 Nationwide Tour money list and earned an exemption for the 2009 PGA Tour season. His best finish that year was a T-7 at the U.S. Bank Championship in Milwaukee.  He finished T-23 at Q-School in December to retain his card for 2010.

In 2010, his best finish was a T-3 at the Children's Miracle Network Classic in November.

In February 2011, Levin finished tied for first at the Mayakoba Golf Classic at Riviera Maya-Cancun with fellow American Johnson Wagner; however, he lost on the first playoff hole, when he made a bogey and Wagner made par on the par-four 18th hole.

Amateur wins
2003 Azalea Invitational
2004 California State Amateur, Porter Cup, Scratch Players Championship

Professional wins (3)

Canadian Tour wins (3)

Playoff record
PGA Tour playoff record (0–1)

Web.com Tour playoff record (0–1)

Results in major championships

LA = low amateur
CUT = missed the half-way cut
"T" = tie

U.S. national team appearances
Amateur
Eisenhower Trophy: 2004 (winners)
Palmer Cup: 2005 (winners)

See also
2008 Nationwide Tour graduates
2009 PGA Tour Qualifying School graduates

References

External links

American male golfers
UCLA Bruins men's golfers
New Mexico Lobos men's golfers
PGA Tour golfers
Korn Ferry Tour graduates
Golfers from Sacramento, California
Sportspeople from Elk Grove, California
1984 births
Living people